Glu or GLU may refer to:

 Glu Mobile, an American mobile game publisher
 Glutamic acid
 God Lives Underwater, an American industrial rock band
 God Lives Underwater (EP)
 Gula language (Chad)
 Guyana Labour Union
 OpenGL Utility Library, a computer graphics library

See also
 Glue (disambiguation)